Edward MacDevitt was a politician in Queensland, Australia. He was a Member of the Queensland Legislative Assembly.

He represented the Electoral district of Kennedy from 1870 to 1873, and the Electoral district of Ravenswood from 1873 to 1874.

Career 
Barrister, Brisbane; Immigration lecturer, Britain, 1874 - 1876

Barrister, Melbourne and Kalgoorlie WA, 1897 - 1898

Personal life 
He was born 1843 in Glenties, County Donegal, Ireland and died 1898 in Melbourne while trying to learn to ride a bike during a heatwave.

References

Members of the Queensland Legislative Assembly
Colony of Queensland people
Attorneys-General of Queensland
Irish emigrants to colonial Australia
1843 births
1898 deaths
19th-century Australian politicians